John Anthony Scalzi (March 22, 1907 – September 27, 1962) was a Major League Baseball player. He played one season with the Boston Braves between June 19 and 24, 1931.

After serving as President of the Colonial League, Scalzi was serving as a scout for the New York Mets when he was killed in a car accident near Port Chester, New York.

Scalzi Park, the largest recreational area within his home city of Stamford, Connecticut, is named after him.

References

External links

1907 births
1962 deaths
Albany Senators players
Baseball players from Connecticut
Boston Braves players
Georgetown University alumni
New York Mets scouts
Road incident deaths in New York (state)
Sportspeople from Stamford, Connecticut